The slender-tailed nightjar (Caprimulgus clarus) is a species of nightjar in the family Caprimulgidae.
It is found in Democratic Republic of the Congo, Ethiopia, Kenya, Somalia, South Sudan, Tanzania, and Uganda.

References

slender-tailed nightjar
Birds of the Horn of Africa
Fauna of Uganda
slender-tailed nightjar
Taxonomy articles created by Polbot